The Gibbs Farm is a museum in Falcon Heights, Minnesota, United States. The site was once the farmstead of Heman Gibbs and Jane DeBow, first built in 1854; the existing farmhouse includes the small, original cabin.  The museum seeks to educate visitors on the lives of 19th-century Minnesota pioneers and the Dakota people who lived in southern Minnesota before the arrival of Europeans.

In 1974 the farm was listed on the National Register of Historic Places.  The listing consists of the farmhouse and barn, as the other museum structures are not original to the site.

Description
An open-air museum, the Gibbs Farm features an original farmhouse, barn, and school house, as well as a replica sod house, bark lodge, and tipi with replica Dakotah furniture, clothing and tools.

The objects in the farmhouse date from the mid-19th century on and are part of the Ramsey County Historical Society collection; those belonging to the Gibbs family are featured in the house tour. Objects of particular interest include a family hair wreath, original wallpaper, a concealed murphy bed and various other original artifacts.

The museum grounds offer visitors a natural Minnesota prairie as it would have looked like in the 19th Century as well as a Dakotah medicine teaching garden (the turtle garden), Dakotah vegetable garden, pioneer vegetable garden, a heritage apple orchard and farm animals.

History 

The museum focuses on the story of Jane Gibbs (née DeBow), who was taken at age six or seven from the neighbor's home where she was living due to her mother's severe illness near Batavia, NY in 1833 by the Stevens, a missionary family. as a replacement for the daughter, their oldest, whom they had lost to illness. The Stevens family also included two younger boys. They eventually brought Jane west with them where they were assigned by the American Board of Missionaries to bring Christianity to the Dakotah people living near  Lake Calhoun, Bde Maka Ska in what is now Minneapolis, Minnesota and Lake Harriet. They arrived at Fort Snelling in May 1835 when Jane was nine or nearly nine years old. Once the mission was built on the shores of Lake Harriet about a mile from the village of Cloud Man,  Jane attended the missionary school with the part Dakotah children of the soldiers stationed at Fort Snelling and traders and learned to speak their language. She developed a close relationship with the Dakotah and was given the name "Zitkadan Usawin" (Little Crow that was Caught).

She moved with the Stevens, who considered her their adopted daughter, to Southern Minnesota and eventually to Illinois where Jane parted company with them after Mrs. Stevens death. She eventually met and married Heman Gibbs in Galena in 1848. They returned to Minnesota in 1849 and bought the land that would become the Gibbs Museum of Pioneer and Dakotah Life in 1849.

Shortly after buying the land, Jane and Heman discovered an Indian trail running through it. Soon they found some of the same Dakotah who Jane had grown up with used the trail on their annual migration North to their wild ricing, hunting and fishing grounds in present-day Forest Lake, Minnesota.

Each year the Dakotah band would stop at the Gibbs farm for up to three weeks to visit with Jane and her family before continuing their journey.

Sod house

After buying the land in 1849, Jane and Heman Gibbs built a small, one-room, dug-out sod house where they lived for 5 years while farming the land. The house was 10'x12' and built with logs and featured a sod roof. This design kept the house well insulated in the winter and cool in the summer.

The original location was next to the farm house and was excavated in 1995. Now a replica built from the architectural investigation stands in the prairie.

Farmhouse 

In 1854 Jane and Heman built a one-room farmhouse just a few yards away from their sod house. It stayed a one-room house for 13 years, providing shelter for the five Gibbs children: Ida (adopted), Abbie, William, Frank and Lillie.

In 1867 the house was enlarged to meet the space needs of the family. The one-room house became an eight-room farm house as big and modern as any in the area. The enlarged house featured a parlor, six bedrooms, the hired men's room (called the "Pen"), and a summer kitchen.

School house 

Heman Gibbs was an educated man and believed in education for his own children and those in the area. In 1871 he sold the land across the street for a schoolhouse and while it was being built he allowed class to be held in the farm house. The Gibbs family also boarded the teacher in their house.

The schoolhouse on the museum grounds today is not the original Heman was instrumental in getting built. This one was built around the same time near Milan, Minnesota, and represents the typical pioneer one-room schoolhouse.

The school house was bought in 1966 for $100 by the Ramsey County Historical Society and had to make the  journey to the Gibbs Museum of Pioneer and Dakotah life between the hours of 9am–3pm while avoiding all major highways or roads.

References

External links

Gibbs Museum of Pioneer and Dakotah Life

Farm museums in Minnesota
Farms on the National Register of Historic Places in Minnesota
Historic house museums in Minnesota
Houses completed in 1854
Museums in Ramsey County, Minnesota
National Register of Historic Places in Ramsey County, Minnesota
Native American museums in Minnesota
Open-air museums in Minnesota